Leer may refer to:
 Leer, Lower Saxony, town in Germany
 Leer (district), containing the town in Lower Saxony, Germany
 Leer (Ostfriesland) railway station
 Leer, South Sudan, town in South Sudan
 Leer County, an administrative division of Unity State in South Sudan
 Leer, Michigan, a small hamlet within Long Rapids Township, Michigan, USA
 , village in North Rhine-Westphalia, Germany, part of Horstmar
 Leer, a form of looking

See also 
Lear (disambiguation)
Lier (disambiguation)
Leers, Nord, France
Van Leer (surname)